Ema Tavola is an artist, curator, arts manager and advocate using art to centralise 'Pacific ways of seeing'.

Tavola was born in Fiji in 1982. Her father is from Dravuni in the Kadavu province of Fiji. Her mother is a third generation Pākehā from Palmerston North in New Zealand. While she was growing up she also lived with her family in London and Belgium. As a teenager they moved to Wellington, New Zealand and she attended Wellington High School. After high school Tavola was having a gap year in Fiji and experienced the 2000 Fiji civilian coup.

Returning to New Zealand Tavola went on to study a Bachelor of Visual Arts from Manukau School of Visual Arts in South Auckland, and got a job with Manukau City Council after graduating.

In 2006 she founded the Fresh Gallery in Ōtara, Auckland as a partnership with Manukau City Council and the local community. In 2013 it re-opened after expansion.

Tavola has speaking engagements at conferences and other places. In 2019 she was a guest speaker at Para Site International Conference, Hong Kong, the Singapore Art Book Fair for NTU Centre for Contemporary Art (Singapore) and Spinning Triangles: Ignition of a School of Design for SAVVY Contemporary (Berlin, Germany / Kinshasa, Democratic Republic of Congo).

In 2019 Tavola opened an independent art gallery called Vunilagi Vou.

Tavola's artworks are held the collections at Auckland Art Gallery.

Curatorial work 

 2016 – Dravuni: Sivia yani na Vunilagi – Beyond the Horizon - New Zealand Maritime Museum 
 2017 – Kaitani – The Physics Room (New Zealand)
 2018 – A Maternal Lens – 4th International Biennial of Casablanca (Morocco)
 2018 – Dravuni: Sivia yani na Vunilagi – Beyond the Horizon - Oceania Centre for Arts, Culture and Pacific Studies, University of the South Pacific (Fiji)

Awards and residencies 
2017 –  Pacific Studies Artist in Residence – University of Canterbury Macmillan Brown Centre

References 

Living people
New Zealand artists
New Zealand curators
Fijian people
People educated at Wellington High School, New Zealand
1982 births
New Zealand women curators